The Bodil Award for Best Actress in a Leading Role is one of the merit categories presented by the Danish Film Critics Association at the annual Bodil Awards. Created in 1948, it is one of the oldest film awards in Europe, and it honours the best performance by an actress in a leading role in a Danish produced film. The jury can decide not to hand out the award; this has happened 12 times since 1953.

Honorees

1940s 
 1948: Bodil Kjer won for her role as Jenny Christensen in Jenny and the Soldier
 1949: Karin Nellemose won for her role as Thyra Sabroe in Kampen mod uretten

1950s 
 1950: Astrid Villaume won for her role as Susanne Drewes in Susanne
 1951: Not awarded
 1952: Bodil Kjer won for her role as Musen Polyhymnia in Mød mig på Cassiopeia
 1953: Not awarded
 1955: Birgitte Federspiel won for her role as Inger Borgen in Ordet
 1956: Sigrid Horne-Rasmussen won for her role as Helga Nielsen in Altid ballade
 1957: Birgit Sadolin won for her role as Johanne 'Joe' Hansen in 
 1958: Clara Pontoppidan won for her role as Enkefru Tang in En kvinde er overflødig
 1959: Birgitte Federspiel won for her role as Vibeke in

1960s 
 1960: Bodil Ipsen won for her role as Bedstemor Gunhild in Tro, håb og trolddom
 1961: Lise Ringheim won for her role as Eva Sørensen in Den sidste vinter
 1962: Not awarded
 1963: Helle Virkner won for her role as Emilie in Den kære familie
 1964:  won for her role as Gudrun in Gudrun
 1965: Lone Hertz won for her role as Tine Bølling in Tine
 1966: Not awarded
 1967: Lone Hertz won for her role as Lene in 
 1968: Harriet Andersson won for her role as Sofia Persson in Mennesker mødes og sød musik opstår i hjertet
 1969: Not awarded

1970s 
 1970:  won for her role as Vera Bagger in Jazz All Around
 1971: Tove Maës won for her role as Gerda Knudsen in 
 1972: Not awarded
 1973: Lotte Tarp won for her role as Birthe Kold in 
 1974: Not awarded
 1975: Agneta Ekmanner won for her role as Marianne Lorentzen in Per
 1976: Ghita Nørby won for her role as Kirsten in 
 1977: Not awarded
 1978: Not awarded
 1979: Kirsten Olesen won for her role as Kirsten in In My Life

1980s 
 1980: Not awarded
 1981: Karen Lykkehus won for her role as Dagmar Larsen in Next Stop Paradise
 1982: Solbjørg Højfeldt won for her role as Karen in 
 1983: Tove Maës won for her role as Inger Marie Maage in 
 1984: Line Arlien-Søborg won for her role as Mette in Beauty and the Beast
 1985: Not awarded
 1986:  won for her role as Molly in 
 1987:  won for her role as Henriette 'Henry in 
 1988: Not awarded
 1989:  won for her role as Maria in

1990s 
 1990: Ghita Nørby won for her role as Regitze in Waltzing Regitze
 1991: Trine Dyrholm won for her role as Pauline in 
 1992: Ghita Nørby won for her role as Rosha Cohen in Freud's Leaving Home
 1993: Anne Louise Hassing won for her role as Kirsten in Pain of Love
 1994: Sofie Gråbøl won for her role as Clara Uldahl-Ege in Black Harvest
 1995: Kirsten Rolffes won for her role as Sigrid Drusse in The Kingdom
 1996: Puk Scharbau won for her role as Lise (20-30 years) in 
  was nominated for her role as Frederik's mother in 
 Charlotte Sieling was nominated for her role as Hannah in 
 1997: Emily Watson won for her role as Bess McNeill in Breaking the Waves
 1998: Sidse Babett Knudsen won for her role as Julie in Let's Get Lost
  was nominated for her role as Johanne in 
 Anneke von der Lippe was nominated for her role as Barbara in Barbara
 1999: Bodil Jørgensen won for her role as Karen in The Idiots

2000s 
 2000: Sidse Babett Knudsen won for her role as Sus in The One and Only
 2001: Björk won for her role as Selma in Dancer in the Dark
 2002: Stine Stengade won for her role as Kira in Kira's Reason: A Love Story
 2003: Paprika Steen won for her role as Nete in Okay
 2004: Birthe Neumann won for her role as Sara in Move Me
 2005: Connie Nielsen won for her role in Brothers
 2006: Trine Dyrholm won for her role as My Larsen in 
 2007: Trine Dyrholm won for her role as Charlotte in A Soap
 2008: Noomi Rapace won for her role in Daisy Diamond
 2009:  won for her role in Terribly Happy

2010s 
 2010: Charlotte Gainsbourg won for her role as She in Antichrist
 Lærke Winther Andersen was nominated for her role as Katrine in 
  was nominated for her role as Charlotte in 
  was nominated for her role as Barbara in 
 Paprika Steen was nominated for her role as Thea Barfoed in Applause
 2011: Trine Dyrholm won for her role as Marianne in Hævnen
 Julie Brochorst Andersen was nominated for her role as Sara in Hold Me Tight
 Ellen Hillingsø was nominated for her role as Nurse Gert in Eksperimentet
 Bodil Jørgensen was nominated for her role as Ingeborg in Smukke mennesker
  was nominated for her role in Smukke mennesker
 2012:  won for her role as Ditte in En familie
 Frederikke Dahl Hansen was nominated for her role as Louise in Frit fald
 Kirsten Dunst was nominated for her role as Justine in Melancholia
  was nominated for her role as Lina in Magi i luften
 2013:  won for her role as Helene in 
 Trine Dyrholm was nominated for her role as Ida in Den skaldede frisør
 Alicia Vikander was nominated for her role as Caroline Matilda of Great Britain in En kongelig affære
 Bodil Jørgensen was nominated for her role as Gudrun Fiil in Hvidsten gruppen
 Julie Brochorst Andersen was nominated for her role as Laura in You & Me Forever
 2014: Charlotte Gainsbourg won for her role as Joe in Nymphomaniac
 Sofie Gråbøl was nominated for her role as Helen in The Hour of the Lynx
 Stacy Martin was nominated for her role as Young Joe in Nymphomaniac
 Helle Fagralíð was nominated for her role as Signe in Sorrow and Joy
 2015: Danica Curcic won for her role in Silent Heart
 2016:  won for her role as Ellen in 
 2017: Trine Dyrholm won for her role in The Commune
 2018: Amanda Collin won for her role in En frygtelig kvinde
 :  won for her role in Holiday

2020s 
 : Trine Dyrholm won for her role in Queen of Hearts
 :  won for her role in A Perfectly Normal Family
 : Birthe Neumann  won for her role in Pagten

See also 

 Robert Award for Best Actress in a Leading Role

References

Sources

Further reading

External links 
  

1948 establishments in Denmark
Awards established in 1948
Actress in a Leading Role
Film awards for lead actress